Laspuña (in Aragonese: A Espunya) is a municipality located in the province of Huesca, Aragon, Spain. According to the 2018 census (INE), the municipality has a population of 291 inhabitants.

The massive rocky Peña Montañesa rise above the town.

Villages
 Ceresa
 El Casal

References

Municipalities in the Province of Huesca